Sofia Middleton (born 12 March 1993) is a Chilean competitive sailor. She competed at the 2016 Summer Olympics in Rio de Janeiro, in the women's 470 class.

References

External links

1993 births
Living people
Chilean female sailors (sport)
Olympic sailors of Chile
Sailors at the 2016 Summer Olympics – 470
21st-century Chilean women